Let  be a finite permutation group acting on a set .  A sequence 

 

Bases and strong generating sets are concepts of importance in computational group theory.  A base and a strong generating set (together often called a BSGS) for a group can be obtained using the Schreier–Sims algorithm.

It is often beneficial to deal with bases and strong generating sets as these may be easier to work with than the entire group. A group may have a small base compared to the set it acts on. In the "worst case", the symmetric groups and alternating groups have large bases (the symmetric group Sn has base size n − 1), and there are often specialized algorithms that deal with these cases.

References

Permutation groups
Computational group theory